Mohammad Arref (born 1950) is an Afghan former wrestler who competed in the 1972 Summer Olympics.

References

External links
 

1950 births
Living people
Olympic wrestlers of Afghanistan
Wrestlers at the 1972 Summer Olympics
Afghan male sport wrestlers